The Secret Life of the American Teenager (often shortened to Secret Life) is an American teen drama television series created by Brenda Hampton. It aired on ABC Family from July 1, 2008, to June 3, 2013.

The series received mixed reviews from critics when it began broadcasting, but was nonetheless generally well received among female and teenage viewers. The pilot episode broke the record for the highest rated debut on ABC Family with 2.82 million viewers, a record previously held by Kyle XY. The season one finale brought in 4.50 million viewers, beating that night's episode of Gossip Girl, which had less than half its usual number of viewers. Premiering with mixed to somewhat positive reviews from critics, and mostly well received among viewers, the second season of Secret Life opened with the largest audience for the series, posting a series high in total viewers with 4.68 million viewers; in adults 18–34, it was the number one scripted original premiere of summer 2009. Furthermore, the mid-season premiere became ABC Family's most watched telecast of all time with viewers ages 12–34, with more than three million viewers watching. 

The show spawned a book entitled The Secret Diary of Ashley Juergens.

Series overview

Season 1
In season one, fifteen-year-old Amy Juergens finds out that she is pregnant after having sex at band camp with a handsome and popular boy, Ricky Underwood. Amy first confides in her two best friends Lauren and Madison about it. Amy also tells Ben Boykewich (the guy she started dating after becoming pregnant) the truth, but he is surprisingly supportive and offers to marry her anyway, despite the protests of his friends, Henry and Alice. When Ricky finds out he is the father, he is willing to be a part of his future child's life, causing Adrian Lee, Ricky's fling for a while to become jealous, especially since Ricky already has his sights on the sweet and virginal Grace Bowman, who was going out with Jack Pappas until he kissed Adrian in front of Grant High School. Much to Adrian's surprise, Grace is not angry at her after a while, and the two girls become friends despite being romantic rivals. Ricky and Ben also compete with each other for Amy's attention and at the end of the season, Amy has her child, a boy whom her sister, Ashley, names John. Amy decides to keep John, after struggling with the decision over the course of the season. Ricky said he would do anything to take care of his new son, John.

Season 2
In season two, Amy's parents Anne and George are divorced, and Anne begins dating again, but when she becomes pregnant, it is revealed that the baby is George's. At the same time, Ashley begins her freshman year at Grant High and resents Amy's legacy as a teenage mother. She befriends a gay classmate named Griffin and they both pledge to remain abstinent throughout high school. Ben returns from his summer trip to Italy. Meanwhile, Amy struggles to raise John and frequently argues with Ricky over custodial arrangements, especially since Ben is becoming jealous of Ricky's constant presence. Eventually, Ben and Amy break up while Ricky and Adrian have agreed to date officially, but Ricky struggles to remain faithful. Grace loses her virginity to Jack on the same night her father dies in a plane crash and is wracked with guilt. She blames Jack and herself for her father's death, which causes Jack to be so upset that he begins drinking heavily. Grace refuses to get out of the car to attend her father's funeral, so Ricky forces her. Grace's brother Tom has trouble adjusting when their mother decides to remarry. Adrian begins to reach out to Amy in order to make peace, so Amy, John, and Ricky can be a family. The season's events culminate with Adrian's cheating on Ricky with Ben on the night of the Mother/Daughter dance, in an attempt to get back at Ricky for kissing Amy. Ricky is angry at both, breaking up with Adrian and refusing to forgive Ben, thus crushing their already-fragile friendship.

Season 3
In season three, everyone finds out Adrian is pregnant with Ben's baby, except for Amy. So, Ben and Amy continue to date and start considering taking their relationship to the next level, while Ben struggles to tell Amy about Adrian. George and Anne Juergens have officially divorced and Anne lives closer to her mother while George stays at the house with Amy and Ashley. Ashley drops out of school and begins homeschooling herself. Kathleen Bowman's husband goes to Zimbabwe for a medical mission to bring aid to third-world people and returns in the season finale with a proposal that he and Kathleen return to live and explore the world. Kathleen is hesitant to accept, not wanting to leave Grace and Tom behind by themselves. Towards the middle of the season, Amy and Ricky begin to date, and everyone is doubtful that Ricky will be faithful. Adrian and Ben decide to get married and the ceremony occurs near the end of the season. In the two-part season finale, Ben and Adrian are living together in their condo and Adrian begins to sense that something might be wrong with their baby. They decide to call the doctor, who has them meet her at the hospital as soon as possible. Adrian gives birth to their stillborn daughter. They named her Mercy. Amy and Ricky have sex after getting home from the hospital.

Season 4
In season four, Amy and Ricky begin to get closer when Amy and John move in with Ricky in his apartment, which is above the butcher shop. Ashley decides to leave LA to go on a road trip with her friend, Toby. Grace goes to Didiju and meets someone new.  Jack and Madison break up after learning Jack still has feelings for someone else. Adrian and Ben deal with the miscarriage, which makes Ben want to leave her. Adrian finds out his plan and tries anything to keep him. While still in mourning, Ben meets someone who immediately has a bad influence on him. Ricky proposes to Amy. Jesse has a graduation party and everyone is invited. But the party ends with 2 broken friendships and 1 broken relationship. George and  Nora grow closer, now as roommates and friends. Anne has an adventure that sparks rumors, realizations, and unexpected journeys.

Season 5

Cast and characters 

 Shailene Woodley as Amy Juergens
 Kenny Baumann as Ben Boykewich
 Mark Derwin as George Juergens
 India Eisley as Ashley Juergens (seasons 1–4; special guest season 5)
 Greg Finley as Jack Pappas
 Daren Kagasoff as Ricky Underwood
 Jorge-Luis Pallo as Marc Molina (season 1; guest season 2)
 Megan Park as Grace Bowman
 Francia Raisa as Adrian Lee-Boykewich
 Molly Ringwald as Anne Juergens (seasons 1–4; special guest star season 5)
 Steve Schirripa as Leo Boykewich (seasons 3–5; recurring seasons 1–2)

Soundtrack

Music 
The series theme, sung by Molly Ringwald, is an upbeat version of Cole Porter's "Let's Do It (Let's Fall in Love)." Other noteworthy music featured in the installments includes:
 Both the first and last episodes of the first season feature the song "Girlfriend" by Avril Lavigne. It was also featured in the second-season episode 22. A piano version of the song was played during mid-4th-season finale.
 In the fifteenth episode of the second season, Jack plays "She Don't Wanna Man" by Asher Roth while he and Madison dance.
 At the Mother-Daughter Dance (Season 2, Episode 19), "Love Story" by Taylor Swift is played in the background while Amy, her mother, and Ashley sit on the bleachers.
 In the fourth episode of the third season, when Adrian sits sadly on the stairs in front of her house, Tom plays "You Are So Beautiful" performed by Joe Cocker on his cell phone before they dance. (Season 3, episode 4).
 The song "Kids" by MGMT appears in the fifth episode of the third season when a slide show of Amy lost in New York is played.
 At a party in the Bowmans' guesthouse, the song "New Day" performed by Tamar Kaprelian is played.
 Bruno Mars' "Just the Way You Are" plays in the final moments of the first half of the third-season finale, including during Ben and Adrian's wedding.
 Sarah McLachlan's "Angel" plays after Ben and Adrian find out the baby is dead, and the montage is played to close the season.
 "Daughters" by John Mayer was featured in the season's first episode during Amy's visit to the clinic.
 In the fifth episode of the fourth season, "Rolling in the Deep" by Adele is played in the beginning during Adrian's walk and at the end of the episode when she is sitting in the empty nursery after punching numerous holes in the wall.
 In the thirteenth episode of the fourth season "S&M" by Rihanna, "Memories" by David Guetta feat. Kid Cudi and "Til ya make it" by "Jamie Lynn Noon" are played at the end of the episode during the dance party.
 At the beginning of first episode of fifth season, when Amy and Ricky went from chapel, is played Bruno Mars' song "Marry You".
 In the last episode when Adrian recollects her school years and relationships is played "Try with Me" by Nicole Scherzinger.
 In the last episode during Ricky's flashback, the song "Blurry" by Puddle of Mudd is played.

Broadcasting
The Secret Life of the American Teenager first aired on ABC Family on July 1, 2008. Season 1 began with 11 episodes broadcast from July 1, 2008, to September 9, 2008. After a hiatus, 12 first-season episodes aired January 5, 2009, through March 23, 2009, despite being marketed as season 2, for a total of 23 episodes. The first season was aired on Canadian broadcaster City starting on September 3, 2008. In early 2009, City removed Secret Life from its schedule. Therefore, MuchMusic started to air the first season in Canada on November 30, 2009, followed by the second season on December 7, 2009. In the United Kingdom Secret Life is available on ABC Studios via sky on demand. It is however broken up into eight seasons in contrast to the original five.

Following the success of its first season, ABC Family announced on January 31, 2009, plans to renew Secret Life. The official press release was released on February 9 and was added to ABC Family's line up on April 7, 2009. The show was renewed for a 24-episode second season, which began airing on June 22, 2009. Season 2 began with 12 episodes broadcast starting June 22, 2009, through September 7, 2009. After a four-month hiatus, the second half of the season returned on January 4, 2010, and concluded on March 22, 2010.

Following their record-breaking, mid-season returns, Make It or Break It, and Secret Life were both picked up for an additional season. The third-season premiere of Secret Life was aired on June 7, 2010, at 8 pm. On January 10, 2011, it was reported that Secret Life was picked up for a fourth season to be shown in Summer 2011 and season three would resume on March 28, 2011, after an extended season break. The second half of the fourth season is set to air on March 26, 2012.

On February 2, 2012, it was announced ABC Family renewed The Secret Life of the American Teenager for a fifth season.

Home media 
Each Secret Life season is released on DVD in separate volumes by Buena Vista Home Entertainment under the ABC Family brand. For unknown reasons, Season one is sold as "Season One and Season Two". Season two is sold as "Volume Three and Volume Four", and similarly for the later seasons. The DVD releases include commentary by cast and crew members on selected episodes, deleted scenes, interviews with the cast, and behind-the-scenes featurettes. The season two, volume two DVD includes a preview of Ashley Juergen's Secret Diary, a novella released on June 15, 2010.

Reception

Critical response
On the review aggregator website Rotten Tomatoes, the first season holds an approval rating of 38% based on 21 reviews, with an average rating of 5.50/10. The site's critics consensus reads, "While The Secret Life of the American Teenager manages to show teens behaving like real teenagers, forced dialogue and an overall lack of originality leaves the show stranded at the border of soap opera parody." On Metacritic, the first season of the show holds a score 48 out of 100 based on reviews from 15 critics, indicating "mixed or average reviews." 

The New York Post praised the series for having a set of characters that are "... real and come from families of all stripes – from intact to single-parent households to one boy in foster care..." However, most mainstream critics didn't embrace the show, likening it to an after-school special "filled with didactic messages and a lotta wooden acting," in the words of Ken Tucker of Entertainment Weekly. The New York Times claimed that "Secret Life must surely be the collective effort of an anti-pregnancy cabal. [...] ABC Family means well but could not have done worse. Secret Life doesn’t take the fun out of teenage pregnancy, it takes the fun out of television" and called the show a "Prime-Time Cautionary Tale". Variety magazine reported that "ABC Family's latest original drama wants to be a slow-motion version of Juno but settles for being an obvious, stereotype-laden teen soap [...] based on first impressions, The Secret Life of the American Teenager should probably stay a secret." ReporterMag's Andrew Rees said, "The show...might be the worst scripted drama on television. Suffering from gag-worthy dialog, horrific plot twists, terrible acting, and characters who not even the best of 3-D glasses could give depth to, it’s a wonder how this show stays on the air."

Some critics praised the new developments of the show's second season, saying they could be "interesting material to build on." Jean Bently of EW Popwatch said that now that the whole "teen going through a pregnancy" plot has played out and the "frustrated young mother" thing is going on, we have room to explore some other topics. She remained hopeful that the writers will not just turn these new problems into issues of the week, instead allowing time for the characters to grieve Marshall's death, deal with Anne's accidental pregnancy, and explore the more emotionally complex aspects of teenage sex.

Ratings
Secret Life received the highest premiere viewership ratings ever for an ABC Family original program. The pilot episode brought in 2.82 million viewers and a 0.9/3 share in the 18- to 49-year-old demographic. Secret Life also scored high in the female demographic, registering a 6.5/24 among female teenagers and a 3.1/11 among 12- to 34-year-old females. The mid-season finale of season one defeated the first hour of the much-publicized series premiere of 90210 on The CW in viewers 12–34 and females 12–34, beating 90210 in total viewers and all their key demographics, and bringing in some of the best ratings of the season for Secret Life. The season one finale brought in 4.50 million viewers and was the highest rated telecast on March 23, 2009, in viewers aged 12–34 and the number one scripted telecast that night. The episode also beat 90210, which had 2.20 million viewers, more than half the usual number.

On Monday, June 22, 2009, Secret Life opened its second season with the largest audience so far, posting a series high in total viewers with 4.68 million viewers, and second-best numbers ever in adults 18–34 with 1.4 million viewers, behind season one's mid-season finale, adults 18–49 with 2.1 million viewers and viewers 12–34 with 2.9 million viewers. In June 2009, Secret Life ranked as cable's number one scripted telecast in females 12–34, and the number one scripted series telecast in viewers 12–34 and female teens. Additionally, Secret Life stood as ad-supported cable's number one telecast this month in female teens. The season debut became cable's number one scripted series premiere of the 2008/2009 season to date in women 18–34, women 18–49, and viewers 12–34, and the number one scripted original premiere of summer 2009 in adults 18–34.

Secret Lifes second season debut stands as cable's number one scripted original series season premiere of summer 2009 in adults ages 18–34 and across core female 18–34, 18–49 and 12–34 demos, ahead of such high-profile series as USA's Royal Pains and Burn Notice, and TNT's The Closer.

With more than 4.55 million people watching the season two mid-season premiere, the episode became ABC Family's most-watched telecast ever in the key 12–34 and teen demos. The episode stands as the series’ second-most-watched episode in viewers and is TV's number one telecast of the season in female teens, cable's number one telecast in females 12–34, and cable's number one scripted telecast in viewers 12–34. The season two mid-season premiere remains cable's number one scripted premiere of the 2009/10 season. It improved nearly one million total viewers over its season two mid-season finale, and was number one in all target demos for the hour.

On Monday, June 7, 2010, Secret Life opened its third season as the number one summer premiere for the 2010 summer season. It drew 1.3 million women 18–49 viewers, 2.3 million viewers 12–34, 1.8 million female 12–34 viewers, and 1.0 million teen viewers, topping high profiles premieres of Burn Notice, Royal Pains, and Pawn Stars. Additionally, Monday's "Secret Life" ranks as summer's number one scripted premiere on cable with 1.2 million viewers adults 18–34. It improved over its season 2 finale, growing by 20% in adults 18–34, by 21% in adults 18–49, and by 10% in viewers 12–34.

Regarding The Secret Life'''s advertising, Laura Caraccioli-Davis, executive vice president of the media buyer Starcom, said, "Nielsen numbers will do the talking in the advertising community, which has a deep respect for success."

The following is a table with the average estimated number of viewers per episode, each season of The Secret Life of the American Teenager on ABC Family.

Accolades

In other media
On June 15, 2010, The Secret Diary of Ashley Juergens was published. Written by Kelly and Courtney Turk, whose previous credits include episodes of 7th Heaven and NCIS, it documents the thoughts of the character Ashley Juergens in the events chronicling the first and part of the second season. It also includes new characters that were not shown on Secret Life''. "We watched the episodes together and then talked briefly about ideas we each had and what we thought Ashley would have to say about whatever the storyline was. Then we separated and exchanged our chapters," Courtney stated while talking about the difference between writing a book and writing for television.

References

Further reading

External links

 
 
 Secret Life of the American Teenager: Episodes and Parent/Teen Episode Discussion Guides by NCPTUP
 Episode List at TVGuide.com

 
2000s American high school television series
2000s American LGBT-related drama television series
2000s American teen drama television series
2008 American television series debuts
2010s American high school television series
2010s American LGBT-related drama television series
2010s American teen drama television series
2013 American television series endings
ABC Family original programming
English-language television shows
Serial drama television series
Teenage pregnancy in television
Television series about families
Television series about teenagers
Television series by Disney–ABC Domestic Television
Television series created by Brenda Hampton
Television shows filmed in Los Angeles
Television shows set in Los Angeles